Sonna of Britonia (?–646–?) was a medieval Britonian priest in Galicia who signed at the Seventh Council of Toledo.

References

External links 

  Official web site of the Diocese of Mondoñedo-Ferrol

7th-century Galician bishops